Lowlak-e Kaslian (also Romanized as Lowlāk-e Kaslīān, Lūlak-e Keseleyān, and Lūlak-e Keselīān) is a village in Kaseliyan Rural District, in the Central District of Savadkuh County, Mazandaran Province, Iran. At the 2006 census, its population was 211, in 43 families.

References 

Populated places in Savadkuh County